The following lists the number one singles on the Australian Singles Chart during the 1940s.

The source for this decade is the "Kent Music Report". These charts were calculated in the 1990s in retrospect, by David Kent, using archival data. Before 1949, charts in Australia were only available on a monthly basis.

Note: during the 1940s, often more than one version of a particular song by different artists charted at the same time, thus more than one artist may be listed for a song. Different versions are separated by a semi-colon ;

1940

1941

1942

1943

1944

1945

1946

1947

1948
 Good-Night Mister Moon by Allan Ryan and William Flynn

1949

See also
Music of Australia
List of musical events
List of Billboard number-one singles

References

 charts sourced from David Kent's Australian Chart Book: based on the Kent Music Report
Australian Record Industry Association (ARIA) official site
OzNet Music Chart

1940s
Number-one singles
Australia